Lophocochlias escondidus is a species of sea snail, a marine gastropod mollusk in the family Conradiidae.

Original description
 Poppe G.T., Tagaro S.P. & Goto Y. (2018). New marine species from the Central Philippines. Visaya. 5(1): 91-135. page(s): 99, pl. 6 figs 1-2.

Distribution
This marine species  occurs off the Philippines.

References

 Rubio F. & Rolán E. (2019). New species of Conradiidae Golikov & Starobogatov, 1987 (= Crosseolidae Hickman, 2013) (Gastropoda: Trochoidea) from the Tropical Indo-Pacific II. The genus Crosseola and the description of Crossolida n. gen. Novapex. 20(3): 49-91.

External links
 Worms Link

Conradiidae